KSOK (1280 AM) is a radio station licensed to Arkansas City, Kansas, in the United States. The station airs a classic country format, and is currently owned by Cowley County Broadcasting, Inc.

References

External links

SOK
Classic country radio stations in the United States